Edith Evanson ( Carlson; April 29, 1896 – November 29, 1980) was an American actress of film, character and television during the Golden Age of Hollywood.

Life and career
She was born Edith Carlson in Tacoma, Washington. Her first job was as a court reporter in Bellingham.

On March 15, 1923, she married Morris Otto Evanson (1893-1975). The couple had no children.

Her first film role came in The Man Who Wouldn't Talk (1940) in an uncredited role. In the 1940s she was in supporting roles mostly as a maid, a busybody, landladies, or middle-aged secretaries. Some of her other film roles include parts in Citizen Kane (1941), Blossoms in the Dust (1941), Woman of the Year (1942), Reunion in France (1942), The Strange Woman (1947), I Remember Mama (1948), Rope (1948), The Damned Don't Cry (1950), The Day the Earth Stood Still (1951) and Disney's Toby Tyler (1960). During her time in Hollywood, she co-starred opposite some of its greatest legends, including Greer Garson, Walter Pidgeon, Orson Welles, Joan Crawford, Michael Rennie, Glenn Ford, Patricia Neal, James Stewart, Irene Dunne, Spencer Tracy, Katharine Hepburn, and Hedy Lamarr.

With the coming of television in the late 1940s she expanded in her career appearing on such shows as You Are There, The Loretta Young Show, Chevron Hall of Stars, Jane Wyman Presents The Fireside Theatre, The Millionaire, Zane Grey Theater, Alfred Hitchcock Presents, The Frank Sinatra Show, Bachelor Father, Alcoa Presents: One Step Beyond, and Lassie.

A stage actress as well as film star, Evanson often appeared in productions which were staged in the Los Angeles area. She played a Swedish mother reminiscing about the births, deaths, and lives of her children in DeWitt Bodeen's play, Harvest of Years in 1946 (Evanson's performance was called "poignant" by the Los Angeles Times). Although Evanson had played one of the aunts in the 1948 film I Remember Mama, she portrayed Mama herself on stage just a year later.

Director George Cukor, a friend of Evanson, asked her to coach Marilyn Monroe on a Swedish accent for Monroe's role in the unfinished film Something's Got to Give (from which Monroe was eventually fired). Evanson spent several months with Monroe, and spoke to her just days before the troubled actress's death.

In the late 1960s and early 1970s Evanson found herself getting little work in Hollywood due to her advancing age; though she was credited with an appearance on Gunsmoke in 1964, playing “Nell”, an old senile housekeeper in the episode “Father’s Love” (S9E24) and in 1974 she made her last appearance in an episode of Apple's Way.

Evanson was a lifelong Democrat who supported the campaign of Adlai Stevenson during the 1952 presidential election. Following her retirement, she lived in Riverside, California, until her death from heart failure on November 29, 1980. Her ashes were scattered into the Pacific Ocean.

Selected filmography

The Man Who Wouldn't Talk (1940) - Hannah (uncredited)
Life with Henry (1940) - Anne - Swedish Maid (uncredited)
Citizen Kane (1941) - Leland's Nurse (uncredited)
Blossoms in the Dust (1941) - Hilda, Mrs. Kahly's Maid (uncredited)
Woman of the Year (1942) - Alma
Girl Trouble (1942) - Huida
Dr. Gillespie's New Assistant (1942) - Hilda (uncredited)
Reunion in France (1942) - Genevieve
Chetniks! The Fighting Guerrillas (1943) - Mother (uncredited)
The Moon Is Down (1943) - Ludwig's Wife (uncredited)
Bomber's Moon (1943) - Elsa (uncredited)
There's Something About a Soldier (1943) - Mrs. Emma Edwards (uncredited)
Swing Out the Blues (1943) - Mrs. T.W. (uncredited)
Four Jills in a Jeep (1944) - French Maid (scenes deleted)
The Soul of a Monster (1944) - Mrs. Jameson, Housekeeper (uncredited)
And Now Tomorrow (1944) - Mrs. Vankovitch (uncredited)
Youth on Trial (1945) - Mother (uncredited)
The Jade Mask (1945) - Louise Harper
Captain Eddie (1945) - Nurse (uncredited)
The Fighting Guardsman (1946) - Mame. Paquin (uncredited)
The Scarlet Horseman (1946) - Lu (uncredited)
The Notorious Lone Wolf (1946) - Olga - Carla's Maid
Mysterious Intruder (1946) - Mrs. Ward (uncredited)
Don't Gamble with Strangers (1946) - Mrs. Fielding - Swedish Maid
The Bachelor's Daughters (1946) - Secretary (uncredited)
The Strange Woman (1946) - Mrs. Coggins (uncredited)
Fun on a Weekend (1947) - Mr. Cowperwaithe's Secretary (uncredited)
The Corpse Came C.O.D. (1947) - Rose's Assistant (uncredited)
Singapore (1947) - Mrs. Edith Barnes
Forever Amber (1947) - Sarah (uncredited)
I Remember Mama (1948) - Aunt Sigrid
Rope (1948) - Mrs. Wilson
The Gallant Blade (1948) - Bit (uncredited)
You Gotta Stay Happy (1948) - Mrs. Racknell
Big Jack (1949) - Widow Simpson (uncredited)
Madame Bovary (1949) - Mother Superior (uncredited)
Perfect Strangers (1950) - Mary Travers
The Damned Don't Cry (1950) - Mrs. Castleman
Caged (1950) - Miss Barker (uncredited)
Union Station (1950) - Mrs. Willecombe (uncredited)
The Magnificent Yankee (1950) - Annie Gough
The Company She Keeps (1951) - Mrs. Holman (uncredited)
The Redhead and the Cowboy (1951) - Mrs. Barrett
Rawhide (1951) - Mrs. Hickman (uncredited)
Ace in the Hole (1951) - Miss Deverich (uncredited)
The Day the Earth Stood Still (1951) - Mrs. Crockett (uncredited)
Elephant Stampede (1951) - Miss Banks
Hans Christian Andersen (1952) - Mrs. Berta (uncredited)
Down Among the Sheltering Palms (1953) - Mrs. Edgett (uncredited)
It Happens Every Thursday (1953) - Mrs. Peterson
Shane (1953) - Mrs. Shipstead
The Stranger Wore a Gun (1953) - Mrs. Martin (uncredited)
The Big Heat (1953) - Selma Parker
About Mrs. Leslie (1954) - Mrs. Fine
Désirée (1954) - Queen Hedwig (uncredited)
The Road to Denver (1955) - Mrs. Garrett (uncredited)
The Silver Star (1955) - Belle Dowdy
City of Shadows (1955) - Mrs. Fellows (uncredited)
The Girl in the Red Velvet Swing (1955) - Josie (uncredited)
The Leather Saint (1956) - Stella
Storm Center (1956) - Mrs. Simmons (uncredited)
The Quiet Gun (1957) - Mrs. Merrick
Drango (1957) - Mrs. Blackford
The Young Stranger (1957) - Lotte, the Dittmar Cook (uncredited)
The Restless Gun (1958) - Aunt Minnie in Episode "A Pressing Engagement"
The Restless Gun (1959) - Episode "The Sweet Sisters"
Journey to the Center of the Earth (1959) - Innkeeper (uncredited)
Toby Tyler (1960) - Aunt Olive
Swingin' Along (1961) - Woman (uncredited)
The Clown and the Kid (1961) - Mother Superior
Twice-Told Tales (1963) - Lisabetta, the landlady
The Prize (1963) - Mrs. Ahlquist (uncredited)
Marnie (1964) - Rita - Cleaning Woman
Penelope (1966) - Newsstand Proprietor (uncredited)
The Split (1968) - Woman in Police Station (uncredited)
The Seven Minutes (1971) - Cassie

References

External links

in the trailer for Rope (1948)

1896 births
1980 deaths
Actresses from Tacoma, Washington
People from Riverside County, California
American film actresses
American television actresses
American Protestants
California Democrats
20th-century American actresses